Idiothauma malgassicella is a species of moth of the family Tortricidae. It is found in Madagascar.

References

Moths described in 1958
Hilarographini
Moths of Madagascar
Moths of Africa
Taxa named by Pierre Viette